Station to Station (released in Germany and Austria as Las Vegas und Andere Stationen) is a 2021 psychological drama written and directed by Benjamin Bryant. Filmed in a production bubble during the coronavirus pandemic, Station to Station was selected as the opening night feature for the 2021 Las Vegas International Film and Screenwriting Festival, where it received multiple jury nominations including for Best Film, and won two, including the festival's Audience Award. The film was released in the United States on January 8, 2022.

Plot 
After learning a long-held family secret, Major Tom Ryan (named for David Bowie's performance persona Major Tom) the son of a Hamptons housekeeper moves to Las Vegas, where he initially finds work as a handyman and has a brief romance with his boss's daughter. After losing his job and girlfriend on the same day, Tom accepts a job offer from Jordan, a stranger he meets out on the town. While Tom is hired to perform maintenance work, he grows increasingly immersed in Jordan's fast-moving Vegas world of youthful excess, easy temptation, and short-term rewards. Tom soon develops close bonds with the eclectic group of people who work for Jordan; as well as a budding romance with Sarah, the brash young woman living across the street.

While Tom's new world seems ideal for a young man seeking to lose himself in the present, emotional remnants of the painful past he left behind in New York start to emerge. Tom pushes even harder to forget, straining his new relationships and creating both internal and external pressures. In a dramatic series of third-act events, it becomes clear to all involved that Tom's unresolved issues make his presence subtly destructive and destabilizing.

Production 
Station to Station was conceived, written, cast, and filmed during the coronavirus pandemic. Principal photography took place on location in Las Vegas, Nevada, in September and October 2021, with actors living and working in a "bubble," eating together onsite and unable to do any sightseeing on their days off. Bryant and producer Tommy Zamberlan scheduled the 11-day principal shoot to minimize the amount of time cast and crew were on set. Changes to the script and desired scene blocking to minimize unnecessary physical proximity for cast and crew were made.  Additional material and a reshoot of the scenes involving Tom and his first girlfriend Jennifer (Cheyenne Alexsys) were reshot in early spring in two locations outside of Bryant and Zamberlan's home base of Washington D.C.

Plans to shoot at real life bars, restaurants, and other Las Vegas locations fell through or were changed due to local coronavirus mandates and related closures. A key scene between the characters of Jordan and Tom at a nightclub was shot on a set when the planned location canceled two days prior, and an extended series of scenes scripted to move throughout a hotel was changed to take place entirely within a suite due to restrictions at the location. Writer-director Bryant noted his initial frustration with these restrictions, but felt the ultimately less ambitious scope and scale of the film allowed for a smaller, more intimate experience for viewers, and may have improved the film creatively and created an affinity for the city within the cast and crew.

The film was shot on a microbudget of less than $25,000, with Bryant stating he is "proud to note" that the shoot was fully insured and all cast and crew on set were paid at the time of the shoot. Zamberlan also served as sound director/recordist, COVID-19 coordinator, set decorator, and assistant editor on the film; and Bryant also served as editor, colorist, production and costume designer, with savings achieved by both deferring compensation. Bryant and Zamberlan's existing joint ownership of professional film and sound equipment allowed the production to avoid camera, sound, and lighting equipment rental fees. Bryant noted the process of making Station to Station as a micro-budget film was complicated, involving "a lot of planning ahead of time, and a lot of compromise and trading-off of those plans when it came time to shoot."

Original songs and score 
Bryant co-wrote three original songs for the film with Austin-based musician and composer Francis McGrath. The nu-disco "Sexy Nightmare" and dance duet "Closer to You" are featured within the film in the nightclub scene when Tom and Jordan first meet, and the rock ballad "Changing Stations" plays over the final moments of the film and the closing credits. The melodies of all three songs are woven into McGrath's original score.

All three songs are credited as "performed by Francis McGrath featuring" singers Kimberly Pollini ("Sexy Nightmare"), Benjamin Bryant and Taryn Hacker ("Closer to You"), and Jon Hacker ("Changing Stations"). The film's music received multiple honors during the festival run, including "Best Musical Score" at the 2021 Las Vegas International Film and Screenplay Festival.

Release  
On October 31, 2021, the Las Vegas International Film and Screenwriting Festival revealed Station to Station to be an Official Selection for the 2021 program, and a finalist for the festival's "Best Drama Feature" honor. On November 5, the festival announced the film would debut as LVIFSF's opening night feature, making its world premiere on November 9, 2021. The film received a total of eight jury and festival nominations and won two. Additionally, it was selected by festival attendees as the "Audience Award winner."

Due to Coronavirus concerns, plans for a limited theatrical release beginning Thanksgiving weekend were scrapped in favor of a January 8, 2022 ticketed "virtual theatrical" global release, with streaming and TVOD availability in the United States starting mid-to-late Q1 2022. In late January 2022, the film's VOD distribution expanded to Germany and Austria under the title Las Vegas und Andere Stationen and in a series of regional international releases over the following weeks. On February 28, 2022, the film's producers announced that film would no longer be available via VOD platforms in Russia or Belarus, in response to the 2022 Russian invasion of Ukraine.

Reception 
Reviews of the film were favorable, with critics mostly praising the Bryant's approach to the subject matter and the acting performances in the film. Markos Papadatos of Digital Journal, found the film "compelling," "intense," and "provocative," praising the writing, direction, and   acting, particularly David Eggers II in his role as Tom. Papadatos likened Bryant's "bold" film debut to that of Paul Thomas Anderson.  K.P. Smith of We Are Entertainment News called the movie a "roller coaster ride" noting the story's twists and turns and a "deeply satisfying film," full of strong acting performances.

While Matt Cassidy of IndieEye found the film to be "a well-spun and twisty tale about relationships, trust and acceptance...and worthy of awards," specifically praising Bryant's ability to bring an ambitious and sprawling story with a large cast to the big screen in his debut film, he felt the film could have benefitted from more activity in the longer two-person scenes and fewer scenes utilizing handheld camera techniques. Cassidy noted his criticisms reflected "common indie film challenges," related to smaller crew sizes and budgets.

Awards and nominations

References

External links 

Official Film Page
 
Virtual Cinema Feature: Station to Station
Station to Station Official VOD (USA and UK)
Las Vegas und Andere Stationen Official VOD (Germany)
Station to Station Official VOD (Global)
Movie of the Day: Station to Station

American independent films
American drama films
2021 films
2021 independent films
2021 drama films
Films set in Nevada
Films postponed due to the COVID-19 pandemic
Films by African-American directors
Films about actors
Films about addiction
Films about sexuality
2021 LGBT-related films
Gay-related films
Bisexuality-related films
Films about Asian Americans
American LGBT-related films
Films shot in Maryland
Films shot in Virginia
Films shot in Nevada
2020s English-language films
2020s American films